Hohe Marter station is a Nuremberg U-Bahn station, located on the line U2.

Opened in 1986, Hohe Marter is a U-Bahn station, designed by the artist Peter Angermann. It has a pixel graphical tile mosaic of the horizontally positioned broadcasting tower on its sides.

References

Nuremberg U-Bahn stations
Railway stations in Germany opened in 1986
1986 establishments in West Germany